Seward is a surname of Old English origin.

Notables of this name include
 Adam Seward (born 1982), National Football League player
 Albert Seward (1863–1941), British botanist and geologist, winner of the 1934 Darwin Medal
 Alec Seward (1901–1972), American blues musician
 Anna Seward (1742–1809), English writer of the 18th century
 Bill Seward (1958–2022), American broadcaster, actor, and coach
 Billie Seward (1912-1982), American actress
 Diane Seward, New Zealand thermochronologist
 Ed Seward (1867–1947), Major League Baseball pitcher
 Frances Adeline Seward (1805–1865), wife of William H. Seward Sr., a First Lady of New York State
 Frederick W. Seward (1830–1915), son of William H. Seward Sr., two-time Assistant Secretary of State
 Gary Seward (born 1961), English professional footballer
 George Seward (1840–1910), U.S. diplomat, envoy to China 1876–1880
 Georgene Hoffman Seward (1902–1992), American feminist psychologist
 Harold H. Seward (1930–2012), developer in 1954 of the Radix sort computer algorithm
 Henry Hake Seward (1778-1848), English architect
 Jack Seward (1924–2010), American writer, linguist and Order of the Sacred Treasure recipient
 James Seward (cricketer) (born 1997), English cricketer
 James L. Seward (New York politician) (born 1951), U.S. Senator
 James Lindsay Seward (1813–1886), American politician, U.S. Representative from Georgia 1853–1859
 Jonathan Lewis Seward (born 1984), bassist of American rock band Avenged Sevenfold
 Julian Seward, developer of bzip2, an open-source data compression program
 Olive Risley Seward (1844–1908), adopted daughter of William H. Seward Sr
 Thomas Seward (1708-1790), English clergyman and author
 Thomas Seward (MP) (died 1406), English MP and merchant
 Vern Seward, American technology writer
 Walter H. Seward (1896–2008), American supercentenarian
 William H. Seward [Sr.] (1801–1872), Governor of New York, U.S. Senator, and Secretary of State under Abraham Lincoln
 William H. Seward Jr. (1839–1920), son of William H. Seward Sr., a brigadier general for the Union during the Civil War
 William Seward (disambiguation), various people with the name
Fictional
 John Seward, character in Bram Stoker's 1897 novel Dracula

See also
Siward (disambiguation)

References